Yury Suzdaltsev (born 16 November 1945) is a Russian former swimmer. He competed in two events at the 1968 Summer Olympics for the Soviet Union.

References

1945 births
Living people
Russian male swimmers
Olympic swimmers of the Soviet Union
Swimmers at the 1968 Summer Olympics
Sportspeople from Astrakhan
Soviet male swimmers